Kartel Records Sdn Bhd is a Malaysian hip-hop record label, dealing predominantly in hip-hop/R&B music, founded by rapper/entrepreneur Joe Flizzow in 2005. In 2008, Kartel Records entered into a distribution agreement with Warner Music Group Malaysia, enabling the record label to market its artists to a wider audience.

History

Beginnings
After years of being signed to EMI Malaysia as an artist and member of Malaysia's hip-hop duo Too Phat, Joe Flizzow decided to take control of his music career by forming his own record label. This gave birth to Kartel Records in 2005.

Rebirth Into Reality
The label's first release was Rebirth into Reality by Too Phat in 2005, jointly-owned and in partnership with EMI Malaysia. This hugely successful release instantly made Kartel Records an award-winning label, taking the Best Local English Album and Best Album Cover awards at the 2006 Anugerah Industri Muzik (AIM).

President
In 2008, Kartel Records released President, the debut solo studio album by Joe Flizzow. President garnered various awards for Joe Flizzow including the coveted "Best Local English Album" award at the 16th annual Anugerah Industri Muzik, continuing the legacy of Kartel Records award-winning releases. President featured many notable collaborations with regional and international superstars such as KRS-One, Jin, Thaitanium, TerryTyeLee and Hady Mirza. This was very much in line with the label's mission to place Malaysia in the forefront of hip-hop music at an international level.

Resurgence
Kartel Records made 5 new artist signings in 2009. These new artists include Altimet (from Malaysia), SonaOne (from Malaysia), Richard J (from Singapore), Micbandits (from Brunei) and DJ Iman (from Malaysia). The signing of Altimet, a prominent figure and popular artist in Malaysia's hip-hop music scene, is regarded by many to be a significant and shrewd move by the label in strengthening its position as one of Asia's fastest growing hip-hop record labels.

Business ventures

Kartel Music Publishing
Kartel Records owns a music publishing company, Kartel Music Publishing, which is sub-published by EMI Music Publishing Malaysia Sdn. Bhd.

Artists 
Luis R Conriquez
Altimet
SonaOne
Richard J
DJ Iman
Ila Damiaa
Yung Raja 
Fariz Jabba
Abubakarxli
Alif (Magicpotion)

Discography

Other releases

Awards

Shout! Awards
2009
Flava Award (Hip Hop / R&B Awards): Joe Flizzow [Won]
Break Out Award (Best New Act): Joe Flizzow [Nominated]

Anugerah Industri Muzik (AIM)
2009 
Best Local English Album: Joe Flizzow - President [Won]
Best New Artist: Joe Flizzow [Nominated]
Best Album Cover: Joe Flizzow - President [Nominated]
Best Local English Song: Joe Flizzow - "All Around the World" featuring TerryTyelee [Nominated]
Best Hip-Hop Song: Joe Flizzow - "Bergerak" featuring Phlowtron, "Isabella" featuring Amy Search and "Mengapa Harus Bercinta" featuring Hady Mirza [Nominated]
2006 
Best Local English Album - Rebirth Into Reality (with Too Phat) [Won]
Best Album Cover - Rebirth Into Reality (with Too Phat) [Won]

Pelangi Awards (Brunei)
2009
Best New Group: Micbandits [Nominated]
Best Group: Micbandits [Nominated]

References

External links 
 Kartellohello.com

2005 establishments in Malaysia
Record labels established in 2005
Malaysian record labels
Contemporary R&B record labels
Hip hop record labels
Privately held companies of Malaysia